The men's 800 metres at the 2019 World Athletics Championships was held at the Khalifa International Stadium in Doha from 28 September to 1 October 2019.

Summary
After the semi-finals, it was no surprise when front runner Wesley Vázquez went to the front of the final.  Donavan Brazier and Marco Arop took the front of the line to follow his pace.  23.51 for the first 200 metres is fast.  Down the first home stretch the rest of the field back off the fast pace, but Brazier stuck right behind Vázquez through a 48.96 first lap.  The real surprise was noted kicker Amel Tuka was at the front of the chase pack, separating through the penultimate turn in chase of the leaders.  When they hit the backstretch, Brazier went around Vázquez, who was showing the signs of the strain.  By 600 metres in 1:15.16, Brazier had two metres on Vázquez, who had two metres on Tuka.  Through the final turn, Brazier held the same gap on Tuka, but Vázquez faded.  Ferguson Rotich was the next contender, three metres back, the rest of the chasers another six metres behind him.  Down the stretch, Brazier was straining, pumping his arms, but Tuka's famed kick was not making up any ground.  40 metres out, Rotich passed Vázquez, but from far off the pace, Bryce Hoppel was gaining fast.  Brazier crossed the line and raised his arms in celebration.  Tuka held off Rotich who beat the fast moving Hoppel.

Brazier's winning time of 1:42.34 was the championship record, North American Continental record and moved him to =#9 on the all time list.

Records
Before the competition records were as follows:

The following records were set at the competition:

Qualification standard
The standard to qualify automatically for entry was 1:45.80.

Schedule
The event schedule, in local time (UTC+3), was as follows:

Results

Heats
The first 3 in each heat ( Q ) and the next six fastest ( q ) qualified for the semifinals. The overall results were as follows:

Semi-finals
The first two in each heat (Q) and the next two fastest (q) qualified for the final.

Final
The final was started on 1 October at 22:14.

References

800
800 metres at the World Athletics Championships